Hermann Diebäcker (August 14, 1910 – April 16, 1982) was a German politician of the Christian Democratic Union (CDU) and former member of the German Bundestag.

Life 
Diebäcker was a member of the German Bundestag from 1957 to 1969. He represented the constituency of Münster in parliament.

Literature

References

1910 births
1982 deaths
Members of the Bundestag for North Rhine-Westphalia
Members of the Bundestag 1965–1969
Members of the Bundestag 1961–1965
Members of the Bundestag 1957–1961
Members of the Bundestag for the Christian Democratic Union of Germany